Senator Moody may refer to:

Blair Moody (1902–1954), U.S. Senator from Michigan
Dan Moody (Georgia politician), Georgia State Senate
Gideon C. Moody (1832–1904), U.S. Senator from South Dakota
James M. Moody (1858–1901), North Carolina State Senate
Jim Moody (1935–2019), Wisconsin State Senate
William J. Moody (1796–1850s), Michigan State Senate
William Moody (Maine politician) (1770–1822), Massachusetts State Senate